The Lomellini Family is a portrait painting by the  Flemish Baroque painter Anthony van Dyck. A group portrait of a landed Genoese family, it is in the Scottish National Gallery in Edinburgh.

Painting
Van Dyck spent the years 1621–1627 in the city of Genoa, painting portraits for the city's wealthiest and most prominent patrons. This work is considered his grandest and most encompassing. It was commissioned by Giacomo Lomellini, the Doge of Genoa, and depicts his family, though he himself does not appear in the work. This is because incumbent doges were forbidden from being depicted, to prevent self-promotion. Lomellini's two eldest sons stand next to his second wife, and to her left are their two youngest children. It was acquired by the Royal Institution in 1830, and transferred to the gallery in 1859.

References

1620s paintings
Paintings in the National Galleries of Scotland
Portraits by Anthony van Dyck
Dogs in art
Paintings of children